ATCO Electric is an electric utility company. Based in Edmonton, Alberta, ATCO Electric transmits and distributes electricity to two thirds of Alberta, namely in north and east-central Alberta, as well as communities in Yukon and the Northwest Territories.

ATCO Electric is owned by Canadian Utilities, which is in turn controlled by ATCO, and its main subsidiaries are:
 ATCO Electric Yukon
 Northland Utilities (50% ownership)

See also
 AltaLink
 EPCOR
 FortisAlberta
 ENMAX

References
 About Us

External links
 

Electric power companies of Canada
Companies based in Edmonton
Hydroelectric power companies of Canada
ATCO